The Alexandra and Eastern Hills Cricket Association (A&EHCA) is a cricket association in the Adelaide Hills and  Fleurieu and Kangaroo Island regions of South Australia. It is an affiliated association of the South Australian Cricket Association. The A&EHCA runs senior men's cricket competitions across five grades (A Grade, A2 Grade, B Grade, C Grade and D Grade) and junior competitions at the under 16, under 14, under 12 and under 10 age groups.

History

Alexandra Cricket Association (1908-1983) 
The earliest recorded match in the Strathalbyn district was played between Strathalbyn and Macclesfield in April 1859.  Several more clubs appeared in the 1860s and 1870s, and for a long time each one organised its own matches against neighbouring towns. Most towns did not have a proper cricket pitch until about 1895-1905 when slate pitches began to be laid. Presumably, until that time just a level piece of ground had to serve the purpose. 

Although the concept of an association had been raised from time to time, it was not until 1908 that one eventuated. It was called the Alexandra Cricket Association (ACA), presumably named after Queen Alexandra, the wife of King Edward VII who was monarch at that time. The original member clubs were based in Strathalbyn, Ashbourne, Milang, and Langhorne Creek. The association lapsed after just one year. It re-formed in 1910/1911 without Milang and Langhorne Creek, but with the addition of Meadows. In 1913/1914 the association lapsed again and was not revived until 1920 when Milang re-joined and Woodchester and Callington entered for the first time. The association lapsed yet again for the 1924/1925 and 1925/1926 seasons. Ashbourne, evidently exasperated with the stop-start nature of the competition, departed in 1925/1926 to join the Great Southern Cricket Association and stayed there for the next five years. Although the ACA re-formed again in 1926/1927 it was now without its trump card, Ashbourne, which had won every premiership except the first. Strathalbyn split into two teams (East and West) and Callington joined up again (but for one year only). Throughout this period, association matches were not scheduled for every Saturday of the season, and clubs were free to organise their own non-association matches on a regular basis. Some clubs continued to play whole seasons of non-association cricket e.g. between 1908 and 1945 Milang was a member of the Alexandra Association for only 12 seasons and Langhorne Creek for only 8 seasons, yet these were two of the biggest towns in the district. They played plenty of cricket, but most of it was outside the Association. Finniss was a late starter and did not join until 1929.  Five years later they won their first of a procession of premierships, and became the new measuring-stick of the competition. In 1932 Strathalbyn withdrew to form its own Strathalbyn Cricket Association of four Strathalbyn teams (Schools, Centrals, Angas and Rovers), but this experiment lasted for only one season – the only time that Strathalbyn was not a member of the ACA.   Belvidere joined up in 1934 and stayed until the intervention of World War II.

The period between 1908 and the early 1930s belonged to Ashbourne which won 11 premierships, but the next period would belong to Finniss. Between 1932 and 1952 Finniss featured in every grand final except one, winning eight in a row, both before and after the war.  The continued dominance of the tiny towns of Ashbourne and Finniss over their much larger rivals Strathalbyn, Milang, and Langhorne Creek, for such a long period, is quite remarkable. Until 1953 Milang had won only one premiership (way back in 1929/1930) and Langhorne Creek had won none at all. Langhorne Creek finally broke through in 1954/1955 for its first premiership, after which Milang got three in a row, and Langhorne Creek three more in a row. Macclesfield entered the association in 1945 (and stayed for seven years), Strathalbyn High School joined in 1946 (for two years), along with Colts in 1952 (for two years). The Colts consisted of players under 20 years of age from Strathalbyn and Milang, and two senior players. None of these teams made much impression or threatened to win any premierships. Milang Colts appeared in 1958 (for four seasons), Langhorne Creek Colts in 1961 (for one year only), and Macclesfield re-entered in 1961 and stayed for 9 years. In 1961/1962 the competition split into separate A & B grades after the first round, and thereafter a B Grade competition existed in one form or another (sometimes from the start of the season, sometimes at the end of the minor round). Hartley joined in 1965 but the club disbanded just five years later. High School entered in 1970 and made a quick impression by winning two premierships in five years. Separate A and B Grades for the whole season commenced in 1978, but it appeared that the competition was stagnating – the same five clubs (Strathalbyn, Milang, Langhorne Creek, Ashbourne and Finniss) were competing every year, and there was a lack of new blood and new challenges.

It so happened that the Mt Barker and Eastern Hills Cricket Association was also stagnating and a hasty round of discussions shortly before the commencement of the 1983/1984 season resulted in a merger of the two associations into the new Alexandra and Eastern Hills Association. The 1983/1984 season commenced with ten teams in A Grade (the above-mentioned five from Alexandra plus Mount Barker, Echunga, Nairne, Wistow, and Bremer/Callington). There were a further eight teams in B Grade (Strathalbyn, Milang, Ashbourne, Langhorne Creek, Bremer/Callington, Echunga, Nairne, and Macclesfield).  Finniss withdrew in 1995, and Hahndorf transferred in from the Hills Cricket Association in 1997. Finniss re-entered in B Grade in 2007/2008, by which time there were seven teams in A Grade, eleven in B Grade, and twelve in C Grade – a total of 30 senior teams.

Between 1908 and 1965 the ACA had only two presidents – James Bell (owner of the chain of Bell's Stores based in Strathalbyn) served from 1908 until his death in January 1936, and the legendary Harry Meyer (from Ashbourne) continued from 1936 to 1965 when he was 80 years of age. More recently, from 1977/1978 until 1989/1990, Keith Ness presided over the transition to the new Alexandra and Eastern Hills Cricket Association. Harry Meyer became the ACA's first Life Member in 1964, Ashbourne's Vin Payne the second in 1965, and Murray Johnson from Langhorne Creek in 1978 was the third (but perhaps through an oversight, it was not awarded until 1982). Since the merger in 1983, eight more stalwarts of the A&EHCA have been awarded Life Memberships: Keith Ness (Finniss), Trevor Calaby (Macclesfield), Perry Jones (Strathalbyn), Clive Wundersitz (Bremer/Callington), Geoff Warren (Langhorne Creek), Roger Farley (Bremer/Callington), Trevor Potts (Langhorne Creek) and Cheryl Gillies (Macclesfield).

The format of match play has varied considerably over the years. Until the 1930s, mainly one-day matches were held, with no compulsory declarations, resulting in a huge number of draws. Even when two-day-matches were introduced there was initially no compulsory declaration at the end of the first day. Most ovals had concrete wickets (with matting), but in 1937/1938 the Association backed Harry Meyer's move to install a turf wicket in Strathalbyn with a view to attracting big matches. Harry organised another turf wicket on his home ground (Ashbourne) in the 1960s, the High School added one in about 1972 before Langhorne Creek followed in about 1973. Callington's was the most recent in the early 1990s. 

Although several clubs have fielded two A grade teams in the same year e.g. Strathalbyn (two A Grade teams for 23 seasons), Milang (for 14 seasons), Langhorne Creek (for 7 seasons) and Finniss (for 2 seasons), on only one occasion in the history of the ACA have two teams from the same club met in a grand final. That was in 1971-1972 when Strath White met Strath Red. Although the ACA celebrated its centenary in 2008, it did not exist for 15 of those years (1909–10, 1913-14 to 1919-1920 inclusive, 1924-5, 1925-6, and 1940-1 to 1944-5 inclusive).

The handsome Alexandra Cup was presented to the A Grade premier from 1908 to 1983. Surprisingly, there appear to be three consecutive errors engraved on the cup – for 1939, 1940 and 1946. Despite the fact that Strath West, Ashbourne, and Callington appear on the Cup, it seems absolutely certain from all other records available that Finniss won all three.

The Meyer Shield inter-association competition was initiated in 1964/1965 named in honour of Harry Meyer's long and outstanding service to the Association. Initially four associations (Alexandra, Hills, Mt Barker & Eastern Hills and Torrens Valley) participated, but the number grew to eight as Great Southern, Southern, Kangaroo Island, and Murray Towns were added in the years ahead. Alexandra has won this competition only three times (1973, 1976, 1977), Mt Barker and Eastern Hills five times (1966, 1967, 1969, 1972, 1974) and Alexandra and Eastern Hills only three times (1989, 1997, 2014). The Under 21 Figg Cup was also awarded from 1964/1965, followed by the Under 16 Calaby Shield from 1978/1979, and the Under 14 Fuller Shield from 1992-1993.

A Rotary Cup knockout one-day competition commenced in about 1975/1976 on Sundays with teams from five local clubs (Strathalbyn, Ashbourne, Langhorne Creek, Milang and Finniss). Within a few years eight more clubs from outside the ACA had all joined in. The final season of the Rotary Club competition was 1995/1996 when Nairne won the title. In recent years it has been replaced by the Courier Super Challenge knockout series involving teams from the three Adelaide Hills based associations – A&EH, Hills and Torrens Valley.

His team was variously called Combined Southern Areas, Alexandra, and Southern (or Fleurieu since 1992), and won the competition in 1926, 1930, 1938, 1955, 1958, 1979, 1994, 1998, 2002, 2004, 2005, 2007 and 2008. The H.R. Meyer Challenge Cup, donated by Ashbourne's Harry Meyer, has been awarded to the winner from 1925 until the present day. One of the H.R. Meyer Cups is housed in the Museum at Adelaide Oval (teams could retain the Cup after three wins). Since the first country carnival in 1895/1896, thirteen centuries and one double century have been scored on Adelaide Oval by Alexandra players. No carnival matches have been scheduled on Adelaide Oval since 1968/1969 so it appears no more players will share that honour.

Another state-wide carnival, conducted by the Country Carnival Cricket Association, is also held in annually. Keith Ness (Finniss) took an Alexandra team to these carnivals for about 25–30 years from the early 1960s. He was said to be the oldest (68 or 69 years) and longest-serving player/manager in the competition when he retired in the late 1980s. Alexandra has won the Shield only twice – in 1980 and 1985. In the 1960s over 40 teams competed but in more recent years the number has fallen to about ten.

The Alexandra junior competition began in a small way in about 1963 when Ralph Briggs (Milang) and Harry Pitt (Strathalbyn) arranged a few scratch matches between the two towns on Saturday mornings for boys under 16 years of age. A year or so later Keith Ness added a team from Finniss. By 1965 there were teams from Ashbourne and Langhorne Creek, and a formal competition was established. Under the A&EHCA, an Under 12 competition was added in 1984, and this was revised to Under 13 in 1986. In 1998 this was separated further into separate Under 14 and Under 12 competitions. By 2007/2008 this had grown to four age groups: Under 16 (7 teams), Under 14 (11 teams), Under 12 (14 teams), and Under 10. This represents an astonishing growth since the A&EHCA was formed in 1983.

Mount Barker and Eastern Hills Cricket Association (1931-1983) 
Cricket has been played in the Adelaide Hills from as far back as 1843, but most clubs probably commenced closer to 1900. The Hills Cricket Association (HCA) was formed in 1922 with four member clubs: Mount Barker, Echunga, Macclesfield, and Meadows. The former three are now members of the A&EHCA, but Meadows is not. However, Meadows had previously been a member of the Alexandra Cricket Association for three years from 1910/1911 to 1912/1913.

The Eastern Hills Cricket Association (EHCA) commenced in 1931/1932 with five member clubs: Bremer, Littlehampton, Nairne, Dawesley and Mount Barker B. Murdoch's Hill and joined a year later, but Dawesley withdrew. Watts’ Brickyard entered in 1933/1934 and disappeared. Mt Barker B withdrew in 1934/1935 to play in their own newly-formed Mt Barker District Cricket Association. Callington and Harrogate joined the EHCA in 1935/1936. Although the EHCA never had more than six teams at a time, 16 different clubs have participated at one time or another. Most have joined up for a few years and then withdrawn, and only three have been regular members on a long-term basis – Bremer (Kanmantoo), Callington, and Nairne.  Other occasional members have been Littlehampton (9 seasons, 5 premierships), Murdoch's Hill (14 seasons, 2 premierships), Woodside (1 season), Woodside RSL (5 seasons, 1 premiership in 1955-6), Harrogate (5 seasons), Mt Barker B (3 seasons), Watts’ Brickyards (10 seasons 1 premiership), 16th Battalion (Woodside, 3 seasons), Monarto (3 seasons), Nairne Veterans (2 seasons), 2nd Field Ambulance (2 seasons), Native Valley (1 season), Dawesley (1 season). 

The J.E. Wooley Shield (named after the EHCA's first president) was presented to the EHCA premier for the 24 years of the association's existence. By far the most successful club was Bremer, with 10 premierships, including the last four (to 1959/1960).

The Mount Barker District Cricket Association (MtBDCA) was formed in 1934/1935 and consisted of three Mount Barker teams (Blues, Whites, and Methodists), plus Wistow. Hahndorf joined a year later, Flaxley and Echunga in 1947/1948, Macclesfield in 1952/1953, and Onkaparinga in 1953/1954. Apart from the Methodists (who lasted only 3 seasons), all of the others listed above were still members in 1960 when the two associations merged. Three other clubs had briefly been members: Littlehampton (1939/1940 & 1946/1947), High School (1946/1947) and Junior Colts (1937/1938). The Dr. R.V. Pridmore Shield was won by Mount Barker teams 14 times in the 20 years before the merger with EHCA. The Whites got 8 premierships, and the Blues got 6, but no team was able to win more than two in a row.

The Mount Barker and Eastern Hills Cricket Association (MtB&EHCA) commenced in 1960/1961 with twelve teams, all in one grade. From the former MtBDCA there were Mt Barker Blue, Mt Barker White, Wistow, Hahndorf, Echunga, Flaxley, and Onkaparinga (but not Macclesfield), and from the former EHCA there were only Bremer, Callington, Nairne 1, and Nairne 2. Murdoch's Hill departed to play in the Torrens Valley Cricket Association, and Hartley entered as a new team  Twelve teams were obviously too unwieldy in one grade, and in the following year two grades were formed, with ten teams in A Grade and six in B Grade. There was a further shakeout in 1962/1963 after which the A Grade settled down to 6-8 teams for the next 20 years. Mt Barker Red joined in 1965/1966, but by 1971/1972 only one Mt Barker team remained in A Grade. Bremer/Callington merged in 1968/1969, and Flaxley/Macclesfield in 1970/1971. Lenswood Ranges made a lightning raid in 1977/1978, having transferred from the Torrens Valley Cricket Association and won four premierships in a row in their five years with MtB&EHCA. However, Lenswood Ranges and Onkaparinga both departed in 1982/1983, and the association was starting to look shaky. There were two other clubs that had briefly appeared in A Grade: Biggs Flat (3 seasons from 1963/1964 to 1965/1966), and Woodside (1966/1967). In the 23 years from 1960/1961 to the final amalgamation with the Alexandra Cricket Association in 1983/1984, the honours had been shared across several clubs: Wistow (8 premierships), Onkaparinga (4), Lenswood Ranges (4), Mount Barker (only 3), Nairne (2), Flaxley/Macclesfield (1), Echunga (1), and Bremer/Callington (1). Wistow obviously punched well above its weight, but the surprise is that Mt Barker Red, White, and Blue did not win more premierships. The Dr R.V. Pridmore Shield was awarded to the A Grade premier of the MtBDCA, and later the MtB&EHCA, from 1935 to 1983. A Colts (Under 16) competition was introduced in about 1964/1965 and continued up until the merger with the Alexandra Cricket Association in 1983.

Alexandra and Eastern Hills Cricket Association (1983 - present) 
The A&EHCA was established ahead of the 1983/1984 season when the Alexandra Cricket Association amalgamated with the Mount Barker and Eastern Hills Cricket Association. The decision to amalgamate the two neighbouring associations was initiated by Keith Ness who was subsequently elected as the first President of the newly established A&EHCA. The foundation clubs of the A&EHCA were Ashbourne, Bremer/Callington, Echunga, Finniss, Langhorne Creek, Macclesfield, Milang, Mount Barker, Nairne, Strathalbyn and Wistow. Finniss went into recess for 12 seasons following the 1995/1996 season before returning in 2007/2008. Milang went into a brief recess after the 2014/2015 season before returning in 2017/2018 (for just one season) and then lapsing once again. Lobethal and Woodside left the Torrens Valley Cricket Association to join the A&EHCA ahead of the 2011/2012 season.

Since the A&EHCA was established, the Southern Argus Shield has been presented to the A Grade premier. As of the end of the 2018/2019 season, Nairne has won 14 premierships, Wistow (5), Strathalbyn (5), Langhorne Creek (3), Mount Barker (3), Milang (3 in the first 5 years), Hahndorf (3), and relative newcomers Woodside (1). In 2020/2021 there were 36 senior teams in the association (9 in A Grade, 8 in A2 Grade, 10 in B Grade, and 9 in C Grade), quite an advance on the 12 teams that existed in 1983/1984.

The 2019/2020 grand final was scheduled to be between Hahndorf and Langhorne Creek however the game was cancelled on the Tuesday prior to the match due to the restrictions that were put in place due to the COVID-19 pandemic. As the higher placed grand final team, Hahndorf were awarded the A Grade premiership.

Current Clubs

Former Clubs

Premiership Winners

Shaun Tait Cricketer of the Year
The Shaun Tait Cricketer of the Year Award was established during the 2005/2006 season and has been presented to the best and fairest player in the A Grade competition as voted by the umpires. The award is named in recognition of former Australian cricketer Shaun Tait who is a product of the Alexandra and Eastern Hills Cricket Association.

Life Members

Office Bearers

Inter-association Competitions 
The Alexandra and Eastern Hills Cricket Association competes in representative cricket carnivals against neighbouring associations in the Fleurieu region. The Fleurieu and District Cricket Council coordinates annual carnivals for the Meyer Shield (seniors), Figg Cup (under 21), Calaby Shield (under 15) and Fuller Shield (under 13).

The Alexandra and Eastern Hills Cricket Association have been the carnival winner on the following years:

Meyer Shield - 1988/1989, 1996/1997, 2013/2014

Figg Cup - 2000/2001, 2009/2010, 2012/2013, 2013/2014, 2016/2017, 2020/2021

Calaby Shield - 2004/2005, 2005/2006, 2006/2007*, 2008/2009, 2009/2010, 2011/2012, 2013/2014, 2014/2015, 2015/2016, 2016/2017, 2017/2018, 2018/2019

Fuller Shield - 2001/2002, 2004/2005, 2006/2007*, 2007/2008, 2008/2009, 2011/2012, 2012/2013, 2013/2014, 2014/2015, 2015/2016, 2016/2017

* denotes joint winner

References

Cricket in South Australia
Cricket administration in Australia